Darren Bradshaw may refer to:

Darren Bradshaw (Australian footballer) (born 1980), Australian rules footballer
Darren Bradshaw (English footballer) (born 1967), English footballer